Ashnola Pass is a mountain pass in the North Cascades of northwestern Washington in the Pasayten Wilderness.  See Ashnola River for name information.

See also
Ashnola Mountain

References

Mountain passes of Washington (state)
Mountain passes of Okanogan County, Washington
Cascade Range